David Rowe (born 2 March 1944) is a former British international cyclist. He competed in the tandem event at the 1972 Summer Olympics. He also represented England in the 1,000 metres match sprint, at the 1970 British Commonwealth Games in Edinburgh, Scotland.

References

External links
 

1944 births
Living people
British male cyclists
Olympic cyclists of Great Britain
Cyclists at the 1972 Summer Olympics
Cyclists at the 1970 British Commonwealth Games
Cyclists from Greater London
Commonwealth Games competitors for England